The steeplechase is an obstacle race in athletics, which derives its name from the steeplechase in horse racing. The foremost version of the event is the 3000 metres steeplechase. The 2000 metres steeplechase is the next most common distance. A 1000 metres steeplechase is occasionally used in youth athletics.

History

The event originated in Ireland, where horses and riders raced from one town's steeple to the next: the steeples were used as markers due to their visibility over long distances. Along the way, runners inevitably had to jump streams and low stone walls separating estates.

The modern athletics event originates from a  cross-country steeplechase that formed part of the University of Oxford sports in 1860. It was replaced in 1865 by an event over barriers on a flat field, which became the modern steeplechase.

It has been a men's Olympic event since the inception of the 1900 Olympics, though with varying lengths until 1908. Since the 1968 Summer Olympics, men's steeplechase in the Olympics has been dominated by Kenyan athletes, including a gold medal streak from 1988 through 2016 and a clean sweep of the medals at the 1992 and 2004 Games.

The steeplechase for women is 3,000 metres long, but with lower barriers than for the men. A distance of 2,000 metres, with a shorter water jump, had been experimented with before the current race format was established.  It made its first major championship appearance at the 2005 World Championships in Helsinki, and in 2008, the women's 3,000 metres steeplechase appeared for the first time on the Olympic program in Beijing.

Other divisions including masters athletics and youth athletics run 2,000 metres distances: the format for a 2,000-metre steeplechase removes the first two barriers of the first lap.

The 1900 Olympics featured a 2500 metres steeplechase and a 4000 metres steeplechase, while a 2590 metres steeplechase was held at the 1904 Olympics, and a lap counting error caused the 1932 Olympics to feature a 3460-meter steeplechase.

Format
A 3,000 metres steeplechase is defined in the rulebook as having 28 barriers and seven water jumps.  A 2,000 meters steeplechase has 18 barriers and five water jumps.  Since the water jump is never on the track oval, a steeplechase "course" is never a perfect 400 meters lap.  Instead, the water jump is placed inside the turn, shortening the lap, or outside the turn, lengthening the lap.  The start line moves from conventional starting areas in order to compensate for the different length of lap.  When the water jump is inside, the 3,000-metre start line is on the backstretch (relative to the steeplechase finish).  When the water jump is outside, the 3,000-metre start line is on the home stretch.  The 2,000-metre start line reverses that pattern and uses  the amount of compensation.

See also

Hurdling

Notes and references

External links

IAAF list of steeplechase records in XML
Women's Steeplechase

 
Athletics by type